Marco Duretto (born 1964) is a manager and senior research scientist at the Royal Botanic Gardens Sydney in Australia.

His primary research interests are systematics and conservation of Rutaceae, Rubiaceae, Orchidaceae, Stylidiaceae and evolution of Australasian flora.

Duretto's projects have included "Phylogeny and biogeography of Boronia (Rutaceae)", "Mutual pollination system involving Boronia (Rutaceae) and moths of the Heliozelidae", "A molecular and morphological phylogeny of the Phebalium Group (Rutaceae)", and "East coast species limits in Stylidium".

Marco Duretto was previously a research scientist with the University of Tasmania.

Standard author abbreviation

Selected published names
Asterolasia exasperata P.R.Alvarez & Duretto
Asterolasia sola Duretto & P.R.Alvarez
Boronia amplectens Duretto
Cyanothamnus acanthocladus (PaulG.Wilson)Duretto & Heslewood
Drummondita borealis Duretto
Leionema bilobum subsp. thackerayense Duretto & K.L.Durham
Pterostylis extranea (D.L.Jones) Janes & Duretto
Zieria vagans Duretto & P.I.Forst.
 See also :Category:Taxa named by Marco Duretto
 and International Plant Name Index: Plant names authored by Duretto

Selected publications
Barrett, R.L., Barrett, M.D., & Duretto, M.F. (2015) Four new species of Boronia (Rutaceae) from the Kimberley region of Western Australia. Nuytsia, 26; 89-109.
 pdf
  pdf
 
Duretto, M.F. (2009). 49 Gunneraceae. Flora of Tasmania Online 
 Duretto, M.F. (2009) 87 Rutaceae.  Version 2009:1, Flora of Tasmania Online
 pdf
 Choia, B.K. & Duretto, M.F. (2008) Correa alba Andrews var. rotundifolia DC.(Rutaceae): an old name for a newly recognised variety endemic to south-eastern Tasmania. Muelleria, 26(2), 45-53.
 Duretto, M.F. & Forster, P.I. (2007) “A Taxonomic Revision of the Genus Zieria Sm. (Rutaceae) in Queensland.” Austrobaileya, vol. 7, no. 3, pp. 473–544. JSTOR
 Duretto, M.F., Durham, K.L., James, E.A.,Ladige, P.Y. (2006) New subspecies of Leionema bilobum (Rutaceae). Muelleria 23: 7–14.
Duretto, M.F. (2003) Notes on Boronia (Rutaceae) in eastern and northern Australia. Muelleria 17 19–135.
 
 Weston, P.H & Duretto, M.F. (1999) ''Boronia fraseri New South Wales Flora Online

References

External links

1964 births
Living people
Botanists active in Australia
20th-century Australian botanists
21st-century Australian botanists
Muelleria (journal) editors